Acacia rigida is a shrub belonging to the genus Acacia and the subgenus Phyllodineae that is native to parts of western Australia.

Description
The rigid green phyllodes have inequilaterally lanceolate to narrowly lanceolate shape that is sometimes linear. It blooms and produces simple inflorescences that occur singly in the axils. The spherical flower-heads contain 8 to 12 loosely pack golden flowers.

Distribution
It is endemic parts of the Wheatbelt region of Western Australia extending from Kellerberrin in the north east around Meckering in the north west to parts of the Darling Range to the east of Mundaring in the south west to Cuballing in the south east where it grows in deep sandy soils or gravelly loam or clay soils in scrub or woodland communities.

See also
List of Acacia species

References

rigida
Acacias of Western Australia
Plants described in 1999
Taxa named by Bruce Maslin